Abyssicoccus albus is a Gram-positive, aerobic and non-motile bacterium from the genus of Abyssicoccus which has been isolated from deep sea sediments from the Indian Ocean.

References

Hyphomicrobiales
Bacteria described in 2016